The Bull is a 2019 Russian crime drama film directed by Boris Akopov. The main prize-winner of the Kinotavr 2019. It was theatrically released in Russia on August 22, 2019 by Novy Film.

Plot 
The film is set in Russia in the 90s. Anton Bykov, the leader of a criminal group, has to earn money by any means in order to feed his family. And suddenly he ends up in a police station, from where he got out thanks to one Moscow authority, who for his help asks Anton for one terrible service...

Cast

References

External links 
 

2019 films
2010s Russian-language films
2019 crime drama films
Russian crime drama films
2019 drama films